The native form of this personal name is Gyöngyössy Bence. This article uses Western name order when mentioning individuals.

Bence Gyöngyössy (born 26 November 1963 in Budapest) Balázs Béla-díj winning Hungarian film producer, film director, cinematographer, screenwriter and actor.

Career 
His parents were Imre Gyöngyössy (1930–1994), Balázs Béla-díj winning film director, poet and Katalin Petényi (1941 –), art historian, film director, screenwriter and editor. He began his secondary school education at the Madách Imre Gimnázium in Budapest, where he attended from 1978 to 1980. In 1980 he moved with his parents to Munich, where he lived until 1997. He graduated from the American High School's Geneva University's international baccalaureate of Munich International School.

From 1983 to 1988, he was a student of communication drama at the Ludwig Maximilian University of Munich. From 1988 to 1994 he studied directing at the University of Television and Film Munich (HFF). Since 1983, he has been active in various film and television productions on all five continents. Over the years he has gained experience not only as a film director and scriptwriter, but also as a production manager, film producer and cinematographer. From 1997 to 2001 he was Programme Director and Member of the Board of RTL Klub, and from 2008 to 2009 he was Programme Director and Member of the Board of TV2. He currently works as a film writer, director and producer in Budapest.

Filmography

Producer 

 Száműzöttek (1991)
 Halál sekély vízben (1994)
 Ámbár tanár úr (1998)
 Barátok közt – tv sorozat (1998–2018)
 Hippolyt (1999)
 Meseautó (2000)
 Hal a tortán – tv sorozat (2008)
 Hitvallók és ügynökök (2009)
 Utolsó rapszódia (2011)

Director 

 Idézet (1988)
 Az utolsó Volga német zenetanár (1989)
 A feltámadás lányai (1990)
 Magány (1992)
 Romani Kris – Cigánytörvény (1997)
 Egy szoknya, egy nadrág (2005)
 Egy bolond százat csinál (2006)
 Papírkutyák (2008)
 Utolsó rapszódia (2011)
 A tanyagondnok (2014)
 Janus (2015)
 A nemzet építésze (2015)
 Olasz – magyar örökség (2015)
 Cseppben az élet (2019)
 A feltaláló (2020)

Cinematographer 

 Kulák volt az apám (2014)
 Örökség a jövőnek – Olasz-magyar kapcsolatok (2015)

Screenwriter 

 Havasi selyemfiú (1978)
 Romani Kris – Cigánytörvény (1997)
 Papírkutyák (2008)
 Utolsó rapszódia (2011)
 Janus (2015)
 A Balaton hullámain

Actor 
 Richard III (1973)

Awards 

 May Ophüls Prize nomination, Germany
 Golden Zenit Award for Best First Feature Film, Montreal World Film Festival (1997)
 Academy Award (Oscar), (Hungarian nomination) – Best Foreign Language Film category
 International Film Festival, Tokyo
 Alexandria International Film Festival – Special Jury Prize
 Balázs Béla-díj (2019)

Bibliography 
MTI Who's Who 2009. Ed. Péter Hermann. Budapest: MTI. 2008. ISBN 978-963-1787-283

References 

1963 births
Hungarian film directors
Hungarian cinematographers
Hungarian film producers
Male screenwriters
20th-century Hungarian screenwriters
Hungarian male writers
Hungarian actors
Living people